Alnwick Town Hall is a municipal building in the Market Place, Alnwick, Northumberland, England. The structure, which was the meeting place of the common council, is a Grade I listed building.

History
The first building on the site was an early 16th century "brewhouse" established by the Earl of Northumberland, as lord of the manor, before passing into private hands and then being acquired by the burgesses in 1585. The burgesses operated it as a brewery for the people of the town but latterly used it as a tolbooth  i.e. municipal building. By the late 17th century the building was in a dilapidated state and the burgesses decided to demolish it and to erect a bespoke town hall in its place.

The new building was designed in the neoclassical style, built in ashlar stone at a cost of £730 and was completed in 1731. The design involved an asymmetrical main frontage with five bays facing onto the Market Place; it featured a steep flight of steps from the ground floor, built across the fourth bay and leading up to a first floor porch in the fifth bay. In the central bay, there was a rusticated and arched entrance to a passageway going through to Fenkle Street. There were sash windows in the other bays on the first floor. At roof level, there was a parapet, and, on the rear elevation, there was a three stage tower with pediments on each side. Internally, the principal room was the public hall, which was used for meetings of the common council, as well as quarter sessions hearings. There were also two adjoining rooms.

A clock, designed and manufactured by a Mr Bell, was added to the tower in 1767, a large shop front was installed in the first and second bays in 1770 and some small corner spires, designed by George Hastings, were added to the tower in 1771. In the early 19th century theatrical events took place in the town hall with Stephen Kemble playing Falstaff there. Illuminated dials were added to the clock, which had to be wound by hand, in 1876. 

After the town became an urban district in 1894, the building remained in use by the urban district council until it moved to new offices at the site of the former Alnwick Workhouse in Wagonway Road after the Second World War. The town hall became the venue for the annual Alnwick Beer Festival, when it was established in 2007, and subsequently also become the venue for a local art gallery.

See also
 Grade I listed buildings in Northumberland

References

Government buildings completed in 1731
City and town halls in Northumberland
Alnwick
Grade I listed buildings in Northumberland